Lucas Silva de Oliveira (born 28 April 1994), known as Lucas Silva, is a Brazilian professional footballer who plays as a forward for Brazilian club Mirassol.

Honours
Tombense
Campeonato Brasileiro Série D: 2014

Santa Clara
AF Ponta Delgada Taça S. Miguel: 2015–16

Jaraguá
Campeonato Goiano - Segunda Divisão: 2019

Mirassol
Campeonato Brasileiro Série D: 2020

References

External links
 

1994 births
Living people
Sportspeople from Bahia
Brazilian footballers
Association football forwards
Campeonato Brasileiro Série B players
Campeonato Brasileiro Série C players
Campeonato Brasileiro Série D players
América Futebol Clube (MG) players
Tombense Futebol Clube players
C.D. Santa Clara players
Palmas Futebol e Regatas players
Rio Preto Esporte Clube players
Central Sport Club players
América Futebol Clube (RN) players
Santa Helena Esporte Clube players
Associação Atlética Anapolina players
Jaraguá Esporte Clube players
Vila Nova Futebol Clube players
Esporte Clube Água Santa players
Mirassol Futebol Clube players